Dermomurex alabastrum is a species of small sea snail, a marine gastropod mollusk in the family Muricidae, the murex snails or rock snails.

Description
The length of the adult shell varies between 16.8 mm and 30 mm.

Distribution
The type locality for this species is Martinique, one of the Windward Islands, in the Lesser Antilles, West Indies. The species has also been found on Antigua and on Nevis. However it is perhaps more common on the Caribbean coast of Central America, having been found in Belize, Costa Rica, Panama, Colombia, and also in Venezuela.

References

Inventaire des Muricidae récoltés au cours de la campagne MADIBENTHOS du MNHN en Martinique (Antilles Françaises) et description de 12 nouvelles espèces des genres Dermomurex, Attiliosa, Acanthotrophon, Favartia, Muricopsis et Pygmaepterys (Mollusca, Gastropoda). Xenophora Taxonomy 36: 22-59

External links
 
 Adams A. (1864 ["1863"). Description of a new genus and twelve new species of Mollusca. Proceedings of the Zoological Society of London. (1863): 506-509]

Gastropods described in 1864
Dermomurex